Marson is a surname.

People
Notable people with the surname include:
Aileen Marson (1912–1939), British actress
Alberto Marson (1925–2018), Brazilian basketball player
Ania Marson (born 1949), English actress
Fred Marson (1900–1976), English footballer
Julie Marson (born 1966), British politician
Leonard Marson (1918–1994), English rugby league player
Lou Marson (born 1986), American baseball player
Mike Marson (born 1955), Canadian ice hockey player
Richard Marson (born c. 1967), English writer, television producer and director
Roberto Marson (1944–2011), Italian Paralympic athlete
Una Marson (1905–1965), Jamaican activist and writer

Fictional characters

See also
 Pierre de Joybert de Soulanges et de Marson (1641–1678)
 Marson (disambiguation)
 Marsone (disambiguation)

English-language surnames
Surnames of British Isles origin
Surnames of English origin